Francois "Faf" de Klerk (born 19 October 1991) is a South African professional rugby union player who plays scrum-half for Japan Rugby League One club Yokohama Canon Eagles and the South Africa national team. He was a member of the South Africa team that won the 2019 Rugby World Cup.

Pre-professional career
Born in Nelspruit (now Mbombela), De Klerk played rugby at Hoërskool Waterkloof in Pretoria.

Career

He joined the  Currie Cup team for the 2016 season.

He joined English Premiership side Sale Sharks prior to the 2017–18 season on a three-year contract. In December 2018, the club announced that De Klerk signed a contract extension until 2023.

After four seasons with the Sharks, de Klerk announced in June 2022 that he would be departing the club at the end of the 2021-22 season to join Yokohama Canon Eagles in Japan Rugby League One.

International career 

De Klerk was rewarded for his Super Rugby form when he was selected by the then recently appointed Springbok coach Allister Coetzee in 's 31-man squad for their 2016 three-test match series against  and made his test debut as the starting scrum-half in the opening test at Newlands Stadium. In a tightly-fought series, Ireland won the first test 26−20, but the Springboks fought back to clinch the series, winning 32−26 in Johannesburg and 19−13 in Port Elizabeth.

After signing for Sale Sharks in 2017, De Klerk was ineligible to represent the Springboks due to having fewer than 30 caps. However, after this selection criterion was abolished in 2018, new Springbok coach Rassie Erasmus recalled De Klerk to the team for the 2018 three-test match series against .

He was a member of South Africa's victorious 2019 Rugby Championship campaign and was duly selected for the 2019 Rugby World Cup. In their 20 October quarter-final match against Japan, he was named Player of the Match. He was a key player for South Africa's World Cup victory, being named as the starting scrum-half in two of their pool matches, as well as all their play-off games.
De Klerk was once again included as the starting scrum-half against England in the 2019 Rugby World Cup Final, which saw South Africa beating England 32−12 to secure a third Webb Ellis Cup lift.

International tries

References

External links
 
 
Interview with BBC Sport (November 2019)

Living people
1991 births
Afrikaner people
South African rugby union players
Rugby union scrum-halves
People from Mbombela
Pumas (Currie Cup) players
Lions (United Rugby Championship) players
South Africa international rugby union players
Rugby union players from Mpumalanga
Golden Lions players
Sale Sharks players
Yokohama Canon Eagles players